Giannis Ikonomidis (born 3 January 1998) is a Greek professional footballer who plays as a midfielder for Super League club Atromitos.

References

1998 births
Living people
Greek footballers
Greece under-21 international footballers
Greece youth international footballers
Super League Greece players
Super League Greece 2 players
Panionios F.C. players
Atromitos F.C. players
A.E. Kifisia F.C. players
Association football midfielders